Dar or DAR may refer to:

Settlements
 Dar es Salaam, the largest city of Tanzania and East Africa
 Dar, Azerbaijan, a village
 Dar, Iran, a village

People
 Dar (tribe), a Kashmiri tribe in India and Pakistan
 Aleem Dar, Pakistani cricketer and international umpire
 Ami Dar, Israeli-American nonprofit leader
 Asif Dar, Pakistani-Canadian boxer
 Abdul Majeed Dar, commander of Hizbul Mujahideen
 Igal Dar (1936–1977), Israeli basketball player
 Mukhtar Dar, Pakistani-born artist and activist
 Noam Dar, Israeli-Scottish professional wrestler
 William Dar (born 1953), Filipino horticulturist and government administrator
 Dar Lyon, an English first-class cricketer
 Dar Robinson, American stunt performer and actor
 Dar Williams, folk-pop artist

Fictional characters
 Dar, the main character in the 1982 fantasy film The Beastmaster and the 1999–2002 Canadian Beastmaster  TV series
 Dar Adal, one of the main characters in the TV series Homeland

Acronyms
 dar (disk archiver), a disk archiving tool similar to tar
 Darzhavna Aeroplanna Rabotilnitsa (Държавната аеропланна работилница) or DAR (ДАР), a Bulgarian aircraft manufacturer
 Daughters of the American Revolution
 Definite article reduction, a linguistic phenomenon
 Department of Agrarian Reform
 Designated Airworthiness Representative, a person authorized to issue Airworthiness Certificates in the United States 
 Digital Assets Repository
 Dominion Atlantic Railway
 Display aspect ratio

Other uses
 Дар, Russian title of Vladimir Nabokov's book The Gift
 DAR!, an autobiographical webcomic by Erika Moen
 DAR, IATA airport code of Julius Nyerere International Airport, Dar es Salaam, Tanzania
 dar, ISO 639-3 code for the Dargwa language

See also
 Darr (disambiguation)

Hebrew unisex given names